NGC 240 is a lenticular or spiral galaxy located in the constellation Pisces. It was discovered on October 22, 1886 by Lewis Swift.

References

External links
 

0240
Pisces (constellation)
002653
Spiral galaxies